The International Socca Federation (ISF) is an organization which sets up the Socca World Cup. It sets up as a governing body for six-a-side football specifically.

History

Formation 
The ISF was formed in late 2017 by leading providers of small-sided football across Europe and the rest of the world. The ISF aims to bring together experts from across the globe. It was officially launched at a ceremony in Birmingham in February 2018, with guests of honour including World Cup and EURO referee Mark Clattenburg.

Eligibility 
As an inclusive organisation, the ability to register to the ISF is open to anyone who wants to run the national 6 a side team in their country, subject to an approval process.

Number of countries involved 
Initially there were 51 countries invited to the launch in Birmingham, UK.

Governance 
The governance structure announced involves a number of top figures from the Socca world. Pakistani businessman Shahzeb Mehmood Trunkwala of World Group was elected as Honorary Vice President, along with English solicitor and charity founder Tim Ollerenshaw.

Management appointments 
The International Socca Federation quickly began to make senior managerial appointments after February's meeting, with Greek businessman Thanos Papadopoulos (founder of Libero S & T) taking over as CEO and German events mogul Christoph Köchy being Head Of Sponsorship.
They will be joined by other experienced staff, such as Stuart Winton who is tournament director. He is considered as one of the finest referees in socca, having officiated at prestigious events such as Star Sixes at the O2 Arena.

Ambassadors 
The International Socca Federation has signed up some of the football figures to be ambassadors. The head of these is Brazilian World Cup winner Ronaldinho, who has experience of socca, having played in exhibition games in Pakistan in summer 2017.

Many of the players who played in these games have signed up to be ambassadors, such as Robert Pires and Ryan Giggs. The latter has given his shirt to Leisure Leagues, one of the partners in the Federation.

Socca World Cup

2018 
The inaugural 2018 Socca World Cup took place in Lisbon, Portugal, at the purpose built Trunkwala Stadium. The matches kicked off on 23 September 2018, when Canada took on Cape Verde and ran all the way through to 29 September 2018, culminating in Germany's 1–0 win over Poland. The match was refereed by Mark Clattenburg.

The tournament received coverage throughout the world, including high profile endorsements from the likes of Lukas Podolski and the Neymar foundation.

2019 
The 2019 Socca World Cup took place in Rethymno, Crete, from 12 to 20 October 2019, and was won by Russia, who beat Poland 3–2 in the final.

2022 
The 2022 Socca World Cup will be played in Budapest, Hungary, in September 2022.

2023 
The 2023 Socca World Cup will be played in Essen, Germany, in the summer of 2023.

Summary

Socca Champions League

2018 
The first ever Socca Champions League took place on October 18–21, 2018 in Porec, Croatia. Dynamik Toruń emerged as champions, beating another team from Poland, Kluge Team Płock, 2–1 in the final.

2019 
The second edition took place in Maribor, Slovenia on 5–September 2019. Slovenian side ARKO Kljucarovci beat last year's champions Dynamik Toruń 4–2 after extra time.

See also
World Minifootball Federation

References 

Association football governing bodies
Minifootball